Visitor, in English and Welsh law, is an academic or ecclesiastical title.

Visitor or Visitors may also refer to:

Geography
 Visitor (mountain), a mountain in eastern Montenegro
 Lake Visitor, a mountain lake in eastern Montenegro

Literature
 Visitor (novel), a novel by C. J. Cherryh
 The Visitor (Applegate novel), an Animorphs novel by K. A. Applegate
 The Visitors (novel), a novel by Clifford D. Simak
 Visitors (Card novel), a novel by Orson Scott Card
 The Visitor (Child novel)
 Visitors (Buffy novel)
 The Visitors (play), a play by Joe Orton
 Visitors (play), a play by Barney Norris
 The Visitor (short story), a 1965 short story by Roald Dahl
 The Visitor, a novel by Sheri S. Tepper 
The Visitor, a novella by Maeve Brennan
 The Visitor, a Valiant Comics title

Film
 The Visitor (1974 film), an Italian comedy film
 The Visitor (1979 film), a thriller by Giulio Paradisi
 The Visitor (2002 film), an Australian film by Dan Castle
 The Visitor (2007 feature film), a U.S. feature film by Thomas McCarthy
 The Visitor (2007 short film), a short film by Dave Smith
 The Visitor (2008 film), a Finnish film
 The Visitor (2015 film), a Turkish film
 The Visitors (1972 film), a drama by Elia Kazan
 The Visitors (1988 film), a 1988 Swedish horror film
 The Visitors, a 1993 French comedy film also known as Les Visiteurs
 The Visitors, the working title of the 2014 film Extraterrestrial
 Visitor (2021 film), a Spanish-Catalan film
 Visitors (2003 film), an Australian horror film
 Visitors (2013 film), an American documentary film
 The Visitor (2022 film), a Blumhouse film

Television
 The Visitor (TV series), an American series
 "The Visitor" (Star Trek: Deep Space Nine)
 "Visitor" (Smallville)
 Visitors (V science fiction franchise), a fictional alien race
 The Whispers (TV series) or The Visitors, a 2015 American TV series
 Návštěvníci (TV series)  or The Visitors, a Czechoslovak series
 "The Visitor", a Ben 10 episode
 "The Visitors", a Monty Python's Flying Circus sketch

Music
 The Visitors (opera), an opera by Carlos Chávez

Bands

 Visitor (band), a UK-based electronic music group
 The Visitors (Australian band), a rock band formed in 1978 in Sydney
 The Visitors (American band), a rock band formed in 1997 in Little Rock, Arkansas
 Visitors, a French rock music project produced in the 1970s by Jean-Pierre Massiera

Albums

 The Visitors (ABBA album) (1981)
 The Visitor (Arena album) (1998)
 The Visitor (Mick Fleetwood album) (1981)
 Visitor (album), an album by onelinedrawing
 The Visitor (Jim O'Rourke album)
 The Visitor (UFO album) (2009)
 The Visitors (The Visitors album) (1983)
 The Visitor (Neil Young album) (2017)
 Visitors, a 1977 album by Automatic Man

Songs
 "Visitors" (song), a 1985 song by Koto
 "The Visitors" (song), a song by ABBA
 "The Visitor", a song by the Black Heart Procession from Amore del Tropico
 "The Visitor", a song by IU from her 2019 EP Love Poem
 "Visitor", a song by Of Monsters and Men from their 2022 EP Tíu

Video games
 The Visitor, a Fortnite: Battle Royale character that was the primary start of the Season 4 "Launch Off!" event and the Season X "The End" event.

Other uses
 The Visitor (newspaper), a Morecambe newspaper
 The Visitors (installation), a 2012 installation and video art piece by Ragnar Kjartansson
 Visitor (fish), a species of velvetfish Adventor elongatus from Australia and New Guinea

People with the surname
 Nana Visitor (born 1957), American actress

See also
 Apostolic visitor, in the Roman Catholic Church, a representative of the Pope assigned to perform a canonical visitation
 Board of visitors, one of several alternative terms for a board of directors
 Canonical visitation
 Health visitor, a nurse working in community health in the UK
 Prison visitor, a person who visits prisons to befriend prisoners and monitor their welfare
 Provincial episcopal visitor, a Church of England bishop assigned to minister to clergy, laity and parishes who do not accept the ministry of women priests
 Quinquennial Visit Ad Limina
 Unique visitor, a statistic describing a unit of traffic to a website
 Visiting scholar
 Visitor health insurance
 Visitor management
 Visitor pattern, a software design pattern
 Visitor visa